Looney or loonie may refer to:

People 
 Looney (surname)
 Looney or lunatic, antiquated term for mentally ill person
 LoOney (born 1980), Serbian singer-songwriter, actor, director and comic artist
 Looney, nickname of William Hinde (1900–1981), British Army major general
 Looney, nickname of Rudy Williams (1909–1954), American jazz saxophonist

Other uses 
 The Looney: An Irish Fantasy, a 1987 comic novel by Spike Milligan
 "Looney", an early version of the poem "The Sea-Bell" by J. R. R. Tolkien
 Loonies, 2002 Dutch family film
 Loonie, common name for the Canadian one dollar coin, which bears an image of the loon
 Looney Labs, a small company known for the Fluxx line of card games

See also
 Looney Tunes, a Warner Bros. animated cartoon series
 Luni (disambiguation)
 Loney (disambiguation)